Michael Lowenthal, an American fiction writer, is the author of four novels, most recently The Paternity Test (University of Wisconsin Press, 2012). Currently an instructor of creative writing at Lesley University, he has been the recipient of fellowships from the Bread Loaf and Wesleyan writers' conferences, the Massachusetts Cultural Council, the New Hampshire State Council on the Arts, and the Hawthornden International Retreat for Writers. His short stories have appeared in literary journals and magazines including The Kenyon Review, Tin House, and Esquire.

Lowenthal grew up near Washington, D.C. and graduated from Dartmouth College in 1990 as a class valedictorian. During his speech, he revealed that he was Dartmouth's first openly gay valedictorian. The Dartmouth Review said that he singlehandedly ruined the graduation ceremony; however, The New York Times reported that this statement earned him a standing ovation.

He was awarded the Jim Duggins Outstanding Mid-Career Novelists' Prize by the Saints and Sinners Literary Festival in 2009. In 2014/15 he was a Picador Guest Professor for Literature at the University of Leipzig's Institute for American Studies in Leipzig, Germany.

Charity Girl
Lowenthal told the Boston Globe that he wrote Charity Girl because he happened to be reading Susan Sontag's book AIDS and Its Metaphors, and was intrigued by a reference to the quarantining during WWI of American women diagnosed with venereal diseases.  Intrigued, he rapidly discovered that 15,000 young women had been summarily sent to detention centers for the duration, and wrote his first historical novel about such a girl.

Published works

 The Same Embrace (Dutton, 1998)
 Avoidance (Graywolf Press, 2002)
 Charity Girl (Houghton Mifflin, 2007)
 The Paternity Test (University of Wisconsin Press, 2012)
Sex with Strangers (University of Wisconsin Pres,, 2021)

References

External links
 Author Website

1969 births
20th-century American novelists
21st-century American novelists
American male novelists
Living people
Novelists from Massachusetts
Dartmouth College alumni
Lesley University faculty
Boston College faculty

American gay writers
American LGBT novelists
20th-century American male writers
21st-century American male writers